The bandoneon (or bandonion) is a type of concertina particularly popular in Argentina and Uruguay. It is a typical instrument in most tango ensembles. As with other members of the concertina family, the bandoneon is held between the hands, and by pulling and pushing actions force air through bellows and then routing air through particular reeds as by pressing the instrument's buttons. Bandoneons have a different sound from accordions, because bandoneons do not usually have the register switches that are common on accordions. Nevertheless, the tone of the bandoneon can be changed a great deal using varied bellows pressure and overblowing, thus creating potential for expressive playing and diverse timbres.

History
The Bandonion, so named by the German instrument dealer Heinrich Band (1821–1860), was originally intended as an instrument for religious and popular music of the day, in contrast to its predecessor, German concertina, which had predominantly been used in folk music. Around 1870, German and Italian emigrants and sailors brought the instrument to Argentina, where it was adopted into the nascent genre of tango music, a descendant of the earlier milonga.

By 1910 bandoneons were being produced in Germany expressly for the Argentine and Uruguayan markets, with 25,000 shipping to Argentina in 1930 alone. However, declining popularity and the disruption of German manufacturing in World War II led to an end of bandoneon mass-production.

Original instruments can be seen in a number of German museums, such as the Preuss family's Bandoneon Museum in Lichtenberg and the Steinhart family's collection in Kirchzarten, Freiburg, which has now been moved to the Tango- and Bandoneon museum in Staufen since July 2014.

Historically, bandoneons were produced primarily in Germany and never in Argentina itself, despite their popularity in that country. As a result, by the 2000s vintage bandoneons had become rare and expensive (costing around $4,000), limiting the opportunities for prospective bandeonists. In 2014, the National University of Lanús announced its plan to develop an affordable Argentine-made bandoneon, which it hoped to market for one-third to one-half of the cost of vintage instruments.

Technique

As with other members of the concertina family, the bandoneon is held between the hands, and pulling and pushing actions force air through bellows and then through particular reeds as selected by pressing the instrument's buttons. As with other concertinas, the button action is parallel to the motion of the bellows, and not perpendicular to it as with an accordion.

Unlike what happens with a piano accordion, but in similar fashion to a melodeon or Anglo concertina, a given bandoneon button produces different notes on the push and the pull (bisonoric). This means that each keyboard actually has two layouts: one for opening notes, and one for closing notes. Since the right and left hand layouts are also different, a musician must learn four different keyboard layouts to play the instrument.

These keyboard layouts are not structured to make it easy to play scale passages of single notes: they were originally laid out to facilitate playing chords, for supporting singers of religious music in small churches with no organ or harmonium, or for clergy requiring a portable instrument (missionaries, traveling evangelists, army and navy chaplains, and so forth).

Unisonoric
While the standard bandoneon is bisonoric (different note on push and pull), some bandoneon variants are monosonoric, or unisonoric (same note on push and pull). These include the Ernst Kusserow and Charles Peguri systems, both introduced around 1925.

Players

The Argentinian bandleader, composer, arranger, and tango performer Aníbal Troilo was a leading 20th-century proponent of the bandoneon. The bandoneon player and composer Ástor Piazzolla played and arranged in Troilo's orquesta from 1939 to 1944. Piazzolla's "Fugata" from 1969 showcases the instrument, which plays the initial fugue subject on the 1st statement, then moves on to the outright tango after the introduction. With his solos and accompaniment on the bandoneon, Piazzolla combined a musical composition much derived from classical music (which he had studied intensively in his formative years) with traditional instrumental tango, to form nuevo tango, his new interpretation of the genre.

List of manufacturers

A list of some current and historical bandoneon manufacturers:
 Asociación Argentina de Luthiers
 Baldoni Accordions (USA)
 Bandoneón AZ - Ángel y Gabriel Zullo (Argentina)
 Bandoneones A. A. Alfred Arnold (Germany, until 1948)
 Bandoneones F. F. - Juan Pablo Fredes (Gambier, La Plata, Argentina)
 Bandoneones Baltazar Estol (Argentina)
 Bandoneones Toscano (Mendoza, Argentina), Vicente Toscano, fabricante y restaurador de bandoneones.
 Bandonion & Concertinafabrik Klingenthal (Germany)
 Mario Bianco (Uruguay)
 Castagnari (Italy)
 Danielson Industria de Acordeões e Bandoneões (Brazil)
 D. & J. Trupin SARL (France)
 Enrique Fasuolo (Argentina)
 Oscar Fisher (Argentina)
 Giustozzi (Italy)
Handzuginstrumente Carlsfeld (Eibenstock, Germany)
 Klaus Gutjahr (Germany)
 Harry Geuns Bandoneons (Belgium)
 Uwe Hartenhauer (Klingenthal, Germany)
 Ricardo Matteo (Uruguay)
 Museo Luis Alfredo Mariani (La Reja, Moreno, Argentina)
 Pigini Fratelli & C. snc (Italy)
 Premier Bandoneonbau Peter Spende (Germany)
 Stagi Accordions & Bandoneons (Italy)
 Tangobrujo Venta & Restauraciones - Daniel Barrientos (Argentina)
 Victoria Accordions Company (Italy)

Prominent players

 Vicente Greco (1888–1924)
 Augusto Berto (1889–1953)
 Eduardo Arolas (1892–1924)
 Anselmo Aieta (1896–1964)
 Osvaldo Fresedo (1897–1984)
 Pedro Maffia (1899–1967)
 Pedro Laurenz (1902–1972)
 Ricardo Malerba (1905–1974)
 Miguel Caló (1907–1972)
 Aníbal Troilo (1914–1975)
 Hector Varela (1914–1987)
 Juan Cambareri (1916–1992)
 Domingo Federico (1916–2000)
 Alberto Caracciolo (1918–1994)
 Enrique Alessio (1918–2000)
 Astor Piazzolla (1921–1992)
 Leopoldo Federico (1927–2014)
 Juan José Mosalini (1943–2022)
 Rubén Juárez (1947–2010)
 Claudio Constantini
 Héctor del Curto
 Per Arne Glorvigen
 Gianni Iorio
 Ryōta Komatsu
 Rodolfo Mederos
 Gabriel Merlino
 Dino Saluzzi

Construction 
Exterior:

A look inside a bandoneon:

Bandoneon-like instruments 
Although these squeezeboxes resemble in appearance, they are not bandoneons.
Chemnitzer concertina

Chromatiphon

BandoMIneDonI

References

External links

Proyecto Bandomecum Bandoneon's Portal Page
Christian's Bandoneon Page

Argentine musical instruments
Concertina
German inventions
Tango